Women's ice hockey tournaments have been staged at the Olympic Games since 1998.  The United States women's national ice hockey team has participated in every tournament since then.  Ten goaltenders and sixty-seven skaters have played for the United States.

Men's ice hockey had been introduced at the 1920 Summer Olympics, and added to the Winter Olympic Games in 1924. In July 1992, the International Olympic Committee (IOC) voted to approve women's hockey as an Olympic event to first be held at the 1998 Winter Olympics.  Until 1998, international women's hockey had been dominated by Canada's national team.  Canadian teams had won every World Championship; however, by 1997, the American team had improved and was evenly matched with Canada.  In thirteen games played between the two teams in 1997, Canada won seven and the United States six.  Canada and the United States dominated the preliminary round of the 1998 tournament, and in their head-to-head match up during the final round-robin game, the United States won 7–4. The two teams met again in the gold medal game, which the United States won 3–1.  

The Canadian and American teams have established a strong rivalry since the 1998 Winter Games, playing each other in the gold medal game in all but one instance.  In a rematch between the two at the 2002 Winter Olympics, Canada won 3–2.  In the 2006 Olympics, the American team advanced to the semi-finals before falling to Sweden.  It marked the first time in international competition that the final would not feature the United States against Canada.  The Americans defeated Finland for the bronze medal.  The 2010 US team included fifteen players making their Olympic debut.  The Americans again met the Canadians in the final, and in a repeat of 2002 the Canadians took the gold, giving the Americans their second silver.  The Canadians again won gold in Sochi at the 2014 Winter Olympics, in a 3-2 overtime win against the US team. In 2018, at the Olympic Winter Games in Pyeongchang, South Korea, the US defeated Canada in the gold medal game, winning in a shoot out.  In the 2022 Winter Olympic games in Beijing, the US lost the gold medal game to Canada, by a score of 3-2.

The United States has won two gold medal, three silver medals, and one bronze medal in women's hockey at the Winter Games.  One player (Cammi Granato) has been inducted into the International Ice Hockey Federation (IIHF) Hall of Fame and the United States Hockey Hall of Fame.  In addition, the 1998 gold medal-winning team was inducted into the United States Hockey Hall of Fame.  Two women (Angela Ruggiero and Jenny Potter) have participated in four tournaments and won four medals (one gold, two silvers, and one bronze).  Potter is the all-time leading American scorer in the women's tournament at the Olympics, with 11 goals, 19 assists and 30 points.  National teams are co-ordinated by USA Hockey and players are chosen by the team's management staff.

Key

Goaltenders

Skaters

See also

List of Olympic men's ice hockey players for the United States
List of Olympic women's ice hockey players for Finland
List of Olympic women's ice hockey players for Canada

References
General

Specific

External links
 USA Hockey – Official website
 2010 Olympic Team – USA Hockey
 Olympic Review and Revue Olympique – LA84 Foundation

Women
 
United States
United States

Ice hockey
Ice hockey
Olympic women
Ice hockey
United States